Barda is a city and the capital of the Barda District in Azerbaijan, located south of Yevlax and on the left bank of the Tartar river. It served as the capital of Caucasian Albania by the end of the 5th-century. Barda became the chief city of the Islamic province of Arran, the classical Caucasian Albania, remaining so until the tenth century.

Etymology
The etymology of the name is uncertain. According to the Iranologist Anahit Perikhanian, the name is derived from Iranian *pari-tāva- 'rampart', from *pari- 'around' and *tā̆v- 'to throw; to heap up'. According to the Russian-Dagestani historian Murtazali Gadjiev, however, the name means "Parthian/Arsacian" (cf. Parthian *Parθaυ; Middle Persian: Pahlav; Old Persian: Parθaυa-). The name is attested in Georgian as Bardav[i].

History

Ancient

According to The History of the Country of Albania, the Sasanian King of Kings (shahanshah) of Iran, Peroz I ordered his vassal the Caucasian Albanian king Vache II to have the city of Perozapat ("the city of Peroz" or "Prosperous Peroz") constructed. However, this is unlikely as the Kingdom of Caucasian Albania had been abolished by Peroz after a suppressing a revolt by Vache II in the mid-460s. The city was seemingly founded by Peroz himself after the removal of the ruling family in Caucasian Albania. Due to its more secure location, it was made the new residence of the Iranian  (margrave). It was located in the Albanian province of Utik. The city was most likely renamed Partaw (cf. Parthian *Parθaυ) between 485–488 and became the new capital of Albania (thus replacing Kabalak) under Vachagan III, who was installed on the throne by Peroz's brother and successor Balash. Regardless, the city did not serve as the residence of the Albanian kings, and was a symbol of foreign rule. The city was fortified by shahanshah Kavad I and renamed Perozkavad ("victorious Kavad"). Nevertheless, the city was still referred to as Partaw. In 552, the city became the seat of the catholicos of the Church of Caucasian Albania. Partaw served as the residence of the Sasanian prince Khosrow (the future Khosrow II) after his appointment to the governorship of Albania by his father Hormizd IV in 580. Partaw was most likely captured before 652 by the Rashidun Caliphate. It became known as Bardha‘a in Arabic.

Medieval

In ca. 789, it was made the second alternate capital (after Dvin) of the governor (ostikan) of the province of Arminiya. Its governors strengthened the defenses of the city in order to counter the invasions of the Khazars attacking from the north. In 768, the Catholicos of All Armenians, Sion I Bavonats'i, convoked an ecclesiastical council at Partav, which passed 24 canons that addressed issues relating to the administration of the Armenian Church and marriage practices. By the ninth to tenth centuries, Barda had largely lost its economic importance to the nearby town of Ganja; the seat of the Catholicos of the Church of Albania was also moved to Bardak (Berdakur), leaving Partav as a mere bishopric. According to the Muslim geographers Estakhri, Ibn Hawqal, and Al-Muqaddasi, the distinctive Caucasian Albanian language (which they called al-Raniya, or Arranian) persisted into early Islamic times, and was still spoken in Barda in the tenth century. Thus, Ibn Hawkal mentioned that the people of Barda spoke Arranian, while Estakhri stated that Arranian was the language of the "country of Barda."

During this time, the city boasted a Muslim Arab population, as well as a substantial Christian community. Barda was even the seat of a Nestorian,(Christian) Bishopric in the 10th century.

Referring to events in the late eleventh century, the twelfth-century Armenian historian Matthew of Edessa described Partav as an "Armenian city ["K'aghak'n Hayots'"], which is also called Paytakaran and located near the vast [Caspian] Sea."

The same Muslim geographers describe Barda as a flourishing town with a citadel, a mosque (the treasury of Arran was located here), a circuit wall and gates, and a Sunday bazaar that was called "Keraki," "Korakī" or "al-Kurki" (a name derived from Greek κυριακή (kyriaki), the Lord's Day and Sunday, as the Armenian word kiraki is). In 914, the city was captured by the Rus, who occupied it for six months. In 943, it was attacked once more by the Rus and sacked. This may have been a factor in the decline of Barḏa in the second half of the tenth century, along with the raids and oppressions from the rulers of the neighboring regions, when the town lost ground to Beylaqan.

Centuries of earthquakes and, finally, the Mongol invasions destroyed much of the town's landmarks, with the exception of the fourteenth-century tomb of Ahmad Zocheybana, built by architect Ahmad ibn Ayyub Nakhchivani. The mausoleum is a cylindrical brick tower, decorated with turquoise tiles. There is also the more recently built Imamzadeh Mosque, which has four minarets.

Modern
Agriculture is the main activity in the area. The local economy is based on the production and processing of cotton, silk, poultry and dairy products. The cease-fire line, concluded at the end of the First Nagorno-Karabakh War in 1994, is just a few kilometers west of Barda, near Terter.

On 27 October 2020, Armenian missiles struck the city which killed at least 21 civilians, including a 7 year old girl, and injured 70 others. Human Rights Watch and Amnesty International verified the use of cluster munition by Armenia.

Notable residents 
 Khosrow II. Khosrow, the last great king of the Sasanian Empire, is first mentioned in the 580s, when he was at Partaw (Barda), the capital of Caucasian Albania. During his stay there, he served as the governor of the kingdom, and managed to put an end to the Kingdom of Iberia and make it into a Sasanian province.
 Mihranids of Caucasian Albania: Javanshir, Varaz-Tiridates I. etc.
 Arabic governors: Muhammad ibn Abi'l-Saj, etc.
 Paykar Khan Igirmi Durt. Qizilbash chieftain in the service of Safavid Persia in the late 16th and early 17th centuries. His career flourished in the southeastern Caucasus, where he ran the governments of Barda and Kakheti on behalf of Shah Abbas I until being overthrown in a Georgian uprising in 1625.

References

Sources

Further reading
 
 
 
 Ulubabyan, Bagrat (1981). Դրվագներ Հայոց արևելից կողմանց պատմության [Episodes from the History of the Eastern Regions of Armenia] Yerevan: Armenian Academy of Sciences.

External links
 

Populated places in Barda District
Caucasian Albania
Capitals of former nations
Sasanian cities
Elizavetpol Governorate
Cities and towns in Azerbaijan
Peroz I